The women's 3000 metres walk event  at the 1987 IAAF World Indoor Championships was held at the Hoosier Dome in Indianapolis on 6 March.

Results

References

3000
Racewalking at the IAAF World Indoor Championships